The Bosnia and Herzegovina dinar was the independent currency of Republic of Bosnia and Herzegovina between 1992 and 1998.

History

Bosnia and Herzegovina declared independence from Yugoslavia in March 1992. The first Bosnian dinar was issued in July 1992, replacing the 1990 version of the Yugoslav dinar at the rate of 1 Bosnia dinar = 10 Yugoslav "1990 dinara". Consequently, the Bosnian dinar was at par with the 1992 version of the Yugoslav dinar when it was introduced.

The first issues were overstamps on Yugoslav banknotes. After suffering from high inflation, a second dinar was introduced in 1994, replacing the first at a rate of 1 "new" dinar = 10,000 "old" dinara. Both these dinars were restricted in their circulation to the areas under Bosniak control. The Croat areas used the Croatian dinar and kuna, whilst the Serb areas used the Republika Srpska dinar.

Along with the Croatian dinar and Yugoslav dinar, the Bosnia and Herzegovina dinar was unstable.

The convertible mark replaced the dinar in 1998. As the name indicated, the mark was convertible into the Deutsche Mark until the latter was replaced by the euro.

See also 
Dinar
Yugoslav dinar
Croatian dinar
Republika Srpska dinar

References 

Economy of Bosnia and Herzegovina
History of the Federation of Bosnia and Herzegovina
Currencies of Europe
Modern obsolete currencies